Lawyers in Love is the seventh album by American singer-songwriter Jackson Browne, released in 1983 (see 1983 in music). It reached number 8 on the Billboard Pop album chart and number 30 on the Billboard 200. It was Browne's fourth straight Top 10 album and stayed on the charts for 33 weeks. Out of eight tracks, four were released as singles. The title song was a top-20 pop hit for Browne (his last on the American pop charts), and was accompanied by one of his first music videos released on MTV.

History 
In the intervening years since 1980's Hold Out and the release of Lawyers in Love, Browne released the single "Somebody's Baby" which became his biggest commercial hit to date. In the track "Downtown", he ad-libs a line to the melody of the Petula Clark song of the same name at the end of the song.

Lawyers in Love was the first album without David Lindley appearing since his first release, Jackson Browne. Replacing Lindley with guitarists Rick Vito and Danny Kortchmar gave this album a different sound.

The album was certified as a gold record in 1983 and platinum in 2001 by the RIAA.

Recording
Co-producer and engineer Greg Ladanyi explained the album's unusual recording sessions: "For this record, Jackson wanted to be downtown, where the people were. So we found a warehouse in downtown L.A., and just turned it into a studio. We set it up so that the band could play without the distractions of a normal studio because, for the most part, Jackson was writing the songs – in terms of the key changes and chord changes – based on what he was hearing when the band was playing. There was no 'Okay, it's take one or take two.' We kept the tape rolling just about all the time. And there are very few overdubs."

Reception

Although "Lawyers in Love", "Tender Is the Night" and "For a Rocker" were successful singles, the album received a lukewarm reaction by critics. In his retrospective review for Allmusic, William Ruhlmann referred to Browne's often overlooked songcrafting, but wrote "...the craft, and the familiar tightness of Browne's veteran studio/live band, couldn't hide the essentially retread nature of much of this material."

Critic Robert Christgau called the album "A satire on, celebration of, and lament for the upper-middle classmates an Orange County liberal knows like he knows his neighbor's backyard..."

Rolling Stone critic Christopher Connelly had a more positive response. In reviewing the album at the time of its release, Connelly felt that the record was "a more nervy, intelligent LP than its predecessor" and "a welcome widening of perspective that allows Browne to escape, once and for all, the L.A. albatross that has hung around his neck." But he despised the "wretched" 5:20 of "antinuke agitprop" that is "Say It Isn't True'" for displaying the worst traits of the album: "No quarrel here with the sentiments he's expressing, but to gravely intone, 'There always has been and always will be war,' over a 'Kum BaYa'-like coo of 'Say it isn't true' — surely, you say to yourself, he can't be that stupid."

Track listing
All tracks composed by Jackson Browne except where noted:
"Lawyers in Love" – 4:18
"On the Day" – 3:56
"Cut It Away" – 4:45
"Downtown" – 4:37
"Tender Is the Night" (Browne, Danny Kortchmar, Russ Kunkel) – 4:50
"Knock on Any Door" (Browne, Craig Doerge, Kortchmar) – 3:39
"Say It Isn't True" – 5:20
"For a Rocker" – 4:05

Personnel 
 Jackson Browne – guitar, vocals
 Craig Doerge – pianos, synthesizers
 Bob Glaub – bass guitar, Hammond organ (on "Say It Isn't True"), guitar (on "Lawyers in Love")
 Doug Haywood – Hammond organ, backing vocals, bass guitar (on "Say It Isn't True") 
 Danny Kortchmar – arrangements
 Russ Kunkel – drums
 Bill Payne – Hammond organ (on "On the Day")
 Rick Vito – lead guitar, backing vocals

Production
 Producers – Jackson Browne and Greg Ladanyi
 Assistant Producer – Brian Reed 
 Engineers – Greg Ladanyi and James Geddes 
 Technical Engineer – Ed Wong 
 Mastered by Doug Sax and Mike Reese at The Mastering Lab (Los Angeles, CA).
 Art Direction and Design – Dawn Patrol and Jimmy Wachtel
 Artwork – Howard Carriker and Joe Sohms
 Photography – Matti Klatt, Randee St. Nicholas and Joe Sohms.

Charts
Album – Billboard (United States)

Singles – Billboard (United States)

References 

Jackson Browne albums
1983 albums
Albums produced by Greg Ladanyi
Asylum Records albums
Albums with cover art by Jimmy Wachtel